BibBase is a free web-service for creating and maintaining publication pages. BibBase takes its input from a BibTex file or from DBLP, Zotero, BibSonomy, or Mendeley. It produces both HTML renderings, which can be embedded into an existing web page, as well as RSS feeds that allows others to subscribe to updates about new publications from the user.

See also
 Comparison of reference management software

References

External links
 Official site

BibTeX
Reference management software